Angasyak (Eñgäsäk) is a rural locality (a selo) and the administrative centre of Angasyakovsky Selsoviet, Dyurtyulinsky District, Bashkortostan, Russia. The population was 1,850 as of 2010. There are 20 streets.

Geography 
Angasyak is located 22 km north of Dyurtyuli (the district's administrative centre) by road. Veyalochnaya is the nearest rural locality.

References 

Rural localities in Dyurtyulinsky District